Hans-Hermann Weyer-Graf von Yorck (born April 22, 1938 in Berlin) is a German title dealer. In the media he is usually referred as Konsul Weyer, and he himself appears as Consul Weyer Graf von Yorck.

Life 
Weyer was born and raised in Berlin. When his father returned from Soviet captivity in 1955, his mother had already had him declared dead and married the British officer Clifford Davis. It took Weyer years to track down his father in Uruguay. His brother became a pilot for a German airline.

His stepfather Davis is said to have given Weyer access to diplomatic circles, through which he established business relations with the ambassadors of poor countries that could not afford professional consulates. At the time, Weyer said he brokered 465 honorary consulates. He belongs to the international jet set. One focus of his business activities is said to have been in South America, where he is said to have maintained personal contacts with Paraguay's then dictator Alfredo Stroessner.

Weyer arranged adoptions by mostly impoverished members of noble houses for his wealthy clientele. He himself had himself adopted by a Countess of Yorck. Since then, his civil surname has been "Weyer-Graf von Yorck". His main residence is Rio de Janeiro, but he also has other residences and owns, among other things, a private island.

For a short time, Weyer made headlines as chairman and candidate for chancellor of the Deutsche Freiheitspartei (DFP), founded in Munich on November 18, 1979. According to its own information, the party had 26,000 members. The DFP ran in the 1980 Bundestag election with only one direct candidate in the constituency of Freising and received 96 votes.

In 1991, Weyer married the physician Christina Scholtyssek (* 1963), a daughter of the diplomat Karl-Heinz Scholtyssek. For many years, Weyer was a guest on television talk shows and appeared in the coverage of numerous gossip magazines as well as in advertisements for Onken GmbH.

Works 
 Zypern heute. Weyer/Austria 1967.
 Schwarz-rot-goldene Titelträger. Ein indiskretes Handbuch für die große Karriere. Munich 1971 (together with Joachim Hemmann and Richard Kerler)
 Ich, der schöne Consul. Karrieren für die Wunderkinder. Goldmann Verlag, Munich 1986, ISBN 3-7770-0426-X.

Records 
 C’est La Vie, Ma Chérie · Du hast so lange nicht gelacht
 Von Hamburg nach Hawaii (only shown on cover)

TV 
 Titel, Orden, Consulate (RTL, 1991, 8 episodes)

Literature

External links 
 
 consulweyer.com

References 

Living people
German socialites
Businesspeople from Munich
Adult adoptees
1938 births